Patak's is a UK brand of Indian-style curry pastes, sauces and spices. It was founded in 1957 by wife-and-husband team Gujarati-British entrepreneurs Shanta Pathak and Lakshmishankar Pathak, who came to Britain, penniless, with their family as refugees from Kenya, and acquired by Associated British Foods in May 2007 for £200 million.

The company supplies 75% of British curry houses with sauces and mixed spices, and supplies major retailers throughout Europe, North America, Australia and New Zealand.

References

External links

 

Food manufacturers of the United Kingdom
Indian cuisine in the United Kingdom
Associated British Foods brands
Companies based in the Metropolitan Borough of Wigan
Brand name condiments